Pakhachi Airport  is an airport in Koryak Okrug, Russia located 2kmW of Ust-Pakhachi. It services small transport aircraft.

References
RussianAirFields.com

Airports built in the Soviet Union
Airports in Kamchatka Krai